The D Line (formerly Red Line from 1993–2006 and Purple Line from 2006–2020) is a fully underground  rapid transit line operating in Los Angeles, running between Downtown Los Angeles and Koreatown district. It is one of seven lines on the Metro Rail system, operated by the Los Angeles County Metropolitan Transportation Authority.

The D Line is one of the city's two fully underground lines (along with the B Line). The two lines share tracks through Downtown Los Angeles before separating in Koreatown. , the combined B and D lines averaged 133,413 boardings per weekday.

In 2020, Metro renamed all of its lines using letters and colors, with the Purple Line becoming the D Line (retaining the purple color in its service bullet) and the Red Line becoming the B Line.

Construction is underway for a major extension of the line to the Mid-Wilshire district, Beverly Hills, Century City, and Westwood, which will add 7 stations and 9 miles of track to the line. The extension is expected to open in phases from 2024 to 2027.

Service description

Route 

The Metro D Line is a  line that begins at Union Station. At Union Station, passengers can connect to the Metro J Line bus rapid transit line, the Metro L Line, and long-distance Amtrak and Metrolink trains. The D Line travels southwest through Downtown Los Angeles, passing through the Civic Center, Pershing Square (near the Historic Core), and the Fashion District. Passengers can connect to the Metro J Line (both directions) at Civic Center Station. At Pershing Square Station, passengers can transfer to the northbound Metro J Line bus at Olive Street/5th Street. At  Station, travelers can connect to the Metro A Line, Metro E Line and the Metro J Line. Up to this point, the track is shared with the Metro B Line: at Wilshire/Vermont, the two lines diverge.

Duplicate service on Wilshire 
The D Line runs below Wilshire Boulevard, which is served on the surface by the Metro Local Route 20 and Metro Rapid Route 720 bus lines.  Despite the same service, Metro considers the redundant bus service justified because both routes frequently run from Downtown Los Angeles. Unlike the D Line, these bus routes run along the entire Wilshire corridor, west to Beverly Hills, Westwood, and Santa Monica.

Hours and frequency of service 
D Line trains run between approximately 5 a.m. and midnight daily.

The first westbound train of the day to Wilshire/Western departs Union Station at 5:01 a.m. and the last westbound train departs at 12:11 a.m. The first eastbound train of the day to Union Station departs Wilshire/Western at 4:40 a.m. and the last westbound train departs at 12:08 a.m.

Trains operate every ten minutes during peak hours Monday through Friday, every twelve minutes during the daytime on weekdays, and all day on the weekends after approximately 10 a.m. (with a 15-minute headway early Saturday and Sunday mornings). Night service is every 20 minutes.

Ridership 
The D Line is utilized mainly as a downtown shuttle on its shared segment with the B Line. The stub between Vermont and Western has very low ridership. According to Metro, the stub is operating 11% complete during peak hours and even lower at other times.

History 

The current D Line is the product of a long-term plan to connect Downtown Los Angeles to central and western portions of the city with a subway system. Original proposals in the 1980s had the subway line running down Wilshire Boulevard to Fairfax Avenue and then north to the San Fernando Valley. Residents in some parts of the city bitterly opposed the subway. A 1985 methane explosion at a Ross Dress for Less clothing store near Fairfax gave Rep. Henry Waxman, who represented the Fairfax District, a reason to derail the project that was opposed by his constituents by prohibiting tunneling in an alleged "methane zone" west of Western on Wilshire.

The groundbreaking for the first segment of the subway was held on September 29, 1986, on the site of the future Civic Center/Grand Park station. Today's D Line was built in two minimum operating segments:

The Hollywood branch (MOS-2B) began service in 1999. Initially, both branches were designated as part of the Red Line, but in 2006 trains traveling between Union Station and Wilshire/Western were rebranded to the Purple Line for greater clarity.

Future expansion

Extension to Westwood 

Metro is constructing a major extension of the D line to Mid-Wilshire, Beverly Hills, Century City, and Westwood. The new project is called the Purple Line Extension (formerly the Westside Subway Extension), and the first phase broke ground on November 7, 2014. Metro released the Final Environmental Impact Report (FEIR) on March 19, 2012, and the first phase of the project (to Wilshire/La Cienega) was approved by Metro's Board of Directors on April 26, 2012. Notice to proceed was issued to Tutor Perini on April 26, 2017 for phase two from Wilshire/La Cienega Station to Century City/Constellation Station. Construction is now underway for all three phases of the extension, which is expected to open in segments between 2024 and 2027.

In Beverly Hills, there was public opposition to the D Line Extension, led by school board president Lisa Korbatov. The opposition existed because of the subway tunnel's route beneath Beverly Hills High School, and Korbatov and Beverly Hills residents were concerned about student safety issues posed by such a tunnel. Korbatov gathered over 5,300 signed petitions to send to President Donald Trump, urging him and Transportation Secretary Elaine Chao to withhold federal funding from the project. Metro ultimately won in court, but Korbatov and the school district sued in state and federal court over environmental concerns for the project.

Proposed Arts District Extension 

Metro officials have proposed extending service on the eastern side of the D Line, allowing subway cars to continue past Union Station to service the Arts District neighborhood east of Downtown Los Angeles. D Line trains pass through Union Station, exit through a portal at Ducommun Street, and stop in the Arts District when they go to and from the Division 20 yard for maintenance and storage. Proposals have included either station at 6th Street or two stations, one at 6th Street and one at 1st Street. In 2018, the Metro board approved a $500,000 expense to undertake pre-design activities, prepare an Environmental Impact Report and conduct public engagement for a potential station at 6th Street. However, it is unclear whether Metro can raise the millions of dollars of funding needed to build the proposed station. One possible solution is a new tax district implemented by the City of Los Angeles that would tax a portion of property value increases in the downtown area and transfer those funds to Metro to help build the station. A draft environmental impact report for the extension and station at 6th Street was undertaken beginning in March 2021.

Station listing 

The following table lists the stations of the D Line, from east to west:

Operations

Maintenance 
The D Line operates from the Division 20 Yard (Santa Fe Yard) located in the Arts District at 320 South Santa Fe Avenue, Los Angeles. This yard stores train cars and equipment used on the B and D Lines. It is also where heavy maintenance is performed on the fleet. Subway trains access this yard by continuing eastward after ending their revenue service at Union Station, exiting tunnels through a portal at Ducommun Street, and then traveling south to the yard's entrance at 1st Street.

Rolling stock 
The D Line uses A650  electric multiple unit cars built by Breda in Italy; these trains are based on similar vehicles that were built by the Budd Company for the Baltimore and Miami rapid transit systems between 1983 and 1986. Trains usually run in four-car during peak hours and two-car outside of peak hours. The cars are maintained in a Metro yard on Santa Fe Drive near 4th Street alongside the Los Angeles River in Downtown Los Angeles.

In March 2017, Metro ordered new CRRC MA HR4000 railcars, some of which will operate on the D Line when the D Line Extension is completed.

References

External links 

 Line homepage 
D Line schedule 

D Line (Los Angeles Metro)
Public transportation in Los Angeles
Public transportation in Los Angeles County, California
Central Los Angeles
Downtown Los Angeles
Koreatown, Los Angeles
Mid-Wilshire, Los Angeles
Wilshire Boulevard
Railway lines opened in 1993
Los Angeles Underground Rapid Transit
1993 establishments in California